Wyndham is a census-designated place (CDP) in Henrico County, Virginia, United States, in the West End area outside of Richmond. The population was 9,785 at the 2010 census. The CDP is named for Wyndham, a planned community there.  It is an affluent suburb of Richmond, Virginia.

Geography
Wyndham is located at  (37.697475, −77.610871).

According to the United States Census Bureau, the CDP has a total area of 3.6 square miles (9.4 km2), all land.

Demographics
As of the census of 2000, there were 6,176 people, 2,068 households, and 1,732 families residing in the CDP. The population density was 1,702.0 people per square mile (656.9/km2). There were 2,190 housing units at an average density of 603.5/sq mi (232.9/km2). The racial makeup of the CDP was 91.42% White, 2.66% African American, 0.10% Native American, 4.55% Asian, 0.23% from other races, and 1.05% from two or more races. Hispanic or Latino of any race were 1.41% of the population.

There were 2,068 households, out of which 55.4% had children under the age of 18 living with them, 79.2% were married couples living together, 3.2% had a female householder with no husband present, and 16.2% were non-families. 13.2% of all households were made up of individuals, and 2.0% had someone living alone who was 65 years of age or older. The average household size was 2.99 and the average family size was 3.32.

In the CDP, the population was spread out, with 35.7% under the age of 18, 2.0% from 18 to 24, 39.2% from 25 to 44, 18.7% from 45 to 64, and 4.4% who were 65 years of age or older. The median age was 34 years. For every 100 females, there were 100.0 males. For every 100 females age 18 and over, there were 96.0 males.

The median income for a household in the CDP was $113,723, and the median income for a family was $121,019. Males had a median income of $93,839 versus $44,911 for females. The per capita income for the CDP was $43,195. About 0.8% of families and 0.9% of the population were below the poverty line, including 1.2% of those under age 18 and none of those age 65 or over.

References

Census-designated places in Henrico County, Virginia
Census-designated places in Virginia